Tavernello is the trade name for an Italian table wine that is widely advertised as Italy's #1 Wine and commercially sold in Italy and internationally by the wine cooperative Caviro.  It is noted for being the first wine produced in Italy which was sold in a Tetra Pak container and also for its low price (under 2 Euros as of January 2009).

The only markets where an exception is made in the packaging of Tavernello wine are in Japan and the UK, where it is sold in traditional wine bottles between 500 and 700 yen / £3.50 and £5 in supermarket chains.  While the bottles initially featured a traditional cork, it was recently changed to an aluminum screw top as a cost-saving measure and to ensure long term freshness.

Appelations sold
Pinot grigio Pinot bianco Veneto IGT
Trebbiano Rubicone IGT
Nero d'Avola Sicilia IGT
Merlot Veneto IGT
Sangiovese Rubicone IGT
Pinot grigio delle Venezie IGT
Merlot Veneto IGT

References

External links
Official Tavernello international website

Wine brands
Italian wine
Italian brands